The Gen. Thomas Lincoln House is a historic house located at 104 Field Street in Taunton, Massachusetts.

Description and history 
It was built in 1805 for Thomas Lincoln, who served in the American Revolutionary War and was appointed to the rank of brigadier general in 1809. The large -story, Federal Period, central chimney house is built on a traditional 5 × 4 plan, with a side-gabled roof and a large central chimney. Its entrance surround is one of the finest of the period in the city, with a tapered pilasters, dentil moulding, and a semi-elliptical fanlight.

It was added to the National Register of Historic Places on July 5, 1984.

See also
National Register of Historic Places listings in Taunton, Massachusetts

References

National Register of Historic Places in Taunton, Massachusetts
Houses in Taunton, Massachusetts
Houses on the National Register of Historic Places in Bristol County, Massachusetts
Federal architecture in Massachusetts
Houses completed in 1805
1805 establishments in Massachusetts